Marine Club is a Somali football club based in Halmuduh, Somalia. They won the Somalia Cup in 1979 and 1986.

References

Football clubs in Somalia